Thomas Madsen-Mygdal (24 December 1876 – 23 February 1943) was a Danish politician from Venstre who served as Prime Minister of Denmark from 1926 to 1929. He was also Minister for Agriculture from 1920 to 1924 and again while concurrently being prime minister.

Early life and education
Madsen-Mygdal was born in Mygdal, Vendsyssel, the son of landstingsmand, statsrevisor N.P. Madsen-Mygdal (1835-1913) and Ane Kirstine Jacobsen (1839–1902). He became a teacher from Jelling Seminarium but later studied agriculture.

Political career
Thomas Madsen-Mygdal was a self-taught farmer, and was also Minister of Agriculture while he was Prime Minister, as he had also been in the Cabinet of Neergaard.

His government had the parliamentary support of the Conservative People's Party, but he lost their support in 1929 when the Conservative People's Party was not satisfied with the resources allocated to the military in the budget. Having lost his parliamentary support on this important issue, new elections were held, and the Social Democrats and the Danish Social Liberal Party came into power.

The University of Aarhus was founded under his government.

Personal life and education

Madsen-Mygdal  married Marie Deichmann, née Rovsing (27 December 1885 - 15 December 1955) on 15 November 1907 in Gentofte. He owned Edelgave from 1921 and until his death. His widow kept the estate until her death in 1955.

References

External links

References
Kristian Hvidt, Statsministre i Danmark fra 1913 til 1995 (1995)

1876 births
1943 deaths
Prime Ministers of Denmark
Members of the Folketing
Members of the Landsting (Denmark)
20th-century Danish politicians
20th-century Danish landowners
Agriculture ministers of Denmark
Leaders of Venstre (Denmark)